Macedonian army may refer to:
 Ancient Macedonian army
 Army of the Republic of North Macedonia